Odetta marci is a species of sea snail, a marine gastropod mollusk in the family Pyramidellidae, the pyrams and their allies.

Description
The shell attains a length of 3.8 mm

Distribution
This species occurs in the Atlantic Ocean off Mauritania.

References

External links
 To Encyclopedia of Life
 

Pyramidellidae
Gastropods described in 1998
Invertebrates of West Africa